In 45 of the 50 states of the United States, the county is used for the level of local government immediately below the state itself. Louisiana uses parishes, and Alaska uses boroughs. In Connecticut, Massachusetts, and Rhode Island, some or all counties within states have no governments of their own; the counties continue to exist as legal entities, however, and are used by states for some administrative functions and by the United States Census bureau for statistical analysis. There are 3,242 counties and county equivalent administrative units in total, including the District of Columbia and 100 county-equivalents in the U.S. territories.

There are 41 independent cities in the United States. In Virginia, any municipality that is incorporated as a city legally becomes independent of any county. Where indicated, the statistics below do not include Virginia's 38 independent cities.

In Alaska, most of the land area of the state has no county-level government. Those parts of the state are divided by the United States Census Bureau into census areas, which are not the same as boroughs. The state's largest statistical division by area is the Yukon–Koyukuk Census Area, which is larger than any of the state's boroughs. Although Anchorage is called a municipality, it is considered a consolidated city and borough.

There are 100 county-equivalents in the territories of the United States: they are the 3 districts and 2 atolls of American Samoa, all of Guam (Guam as one single county-equivalent), the 4 municipalities in the Northern Mariana Islands, the 78 municipalities of Puerto Rico, the 3 main islands of the U.S. Virgin Islands, and the 9 islands in the U.S. Minor Outlying Islands. All of these territorial county-equivalents are defined by the U.S. Census Bureau.

Count

This is the number of counties and county-equivalents for each state, the District of Columbia, the 5 inhabited territories of the United States, and the U.S. Minor Outlying Islands.

Lists of counties and county equivalents by number per political division:

 Total (50 states and District of Columbia): 3,143 (3,007 counties and 136 county equivalents)
 Total (50 states, District of Columbia and territories): 3,243 (3,007 counties and 236 county equivalents)
 Average number of counties per state (not including D.C. and the territories): 62.84
 Average number of counties per state (including D.C. and the territories): 56.8947368421

Population

Nationwide population extremes

These rankings include county equivalents.

The following is a list of the least populous counties and county-equivalents in all U.S. territory. Note that the only entity on this list with a permanent human population is Swains Island, American Samoa. The first 8 counties (county-equivalents) are uninhabited, while the 10th on the list (Palmyra Atoll) has a small non-permanent human population whose maximum capacity is 20 people.

Population per state or territory

Area

Nationwide land area extremes

The largest counties and county-equivalents are organized boroughs and the census areas of Alaska with the top two being Yukon–Koyukuk Census Area and North Slope Borough.

The following two tables exclude county-equivalents:

The following two tables include county-equivalents: 

Largest county or county-equivalent: Yukon-Koyukuk Census Area, Alaska
Largest true county: San Bernardino County, California
Smallest county or county-equivalent: Kingman Reef, U.S. Minor Outlying Islands
Smallest county or county-equivalent in the 50 states: Independent City of Falls Church, Virginia
Smallest true county: Kalawao County, Hawaii

Smallest, largest, and average area per state and territory

The following is a list of counties and county-equivalents showing the average size of each state/territory's counties, the smallest county (or equivalent) in each state/territory, and the largest county (or equivalent) in each state/territory. States/territories on the list are arranged by the average land area of their counties. Though not on the list, the North Slope Borough is the largest independently incorporated county equivalent. The Unorganized Borough is substantially larger, but is an extension of the State of Alaska government and not independently incorporated.

Also note that the smallest land area with county-level governance in the U.S. is Falls Church, Virginia, but it is an independent city and not a county or part of one. Kingman Reef is the smallest county-equivalent in all U.S. territory (though it has no government). Kalawao County, Hawaii is the smallest true county by land area.

Population density

Most densely populated

Data presented below is based on U.S. Census department data from 2010.  Calculations are made by dividing the population by the land area. All county equivalents are included. This list includes the 50 most densely-populated counties and county-equivalents in the 50 states and District of Columbia, plus the 9 highest-density municipalities (county-equivalents) of Puerto Rico. Puerto Rico is the only U.S. territory with population densities (of county-equivalents) high enough to be on this list. Note that many of these high-density counties are coterminous with large cities (for example San Francisco and Philadelphia) or are independent cities in Virginia (as well as Baltimore and St. Louis) which are considered county-equivalents.

Least densely populated

This list was generated by dividing the population by the land area. All county equivalents are included. The list is dominated by just a few states: Alaska, Montana, and Texas together comprise about two-thirds of the entries. The Unorganized Borough is not included here as a unit, but its census areas (non-governmental entities) are.

The 8 uninhabited county-equivalents in the U.S. territories are listed at the top of the table — these are technically the least-densely populated counties/county-equivalents in the United States, but since they have no people, they are listed unranked.

Population density per state and territory
Data presented below is based on U.S. Census Bureau data from 2010. Calculations are made by dividing the population by the land area. All county equivalents are included.

The District of Columbia and Guam each only have one county-equivalent, so their most/least densely-populated county is the same.

See also
 Local government in the United States

Notes

References

External links
Labor Statistics County Employment and Wages

 
Political divisions of the United States

de:County (Vereinigte Staaten)#Statistiken